The Criminal Investigative Division (CID) is a division within the Criminal, Cyber, Response, and Services Branch of the Federal Bureau of Investigation. The CID is the primary component within the FBI responsible for overseeing FBI investigations of traditional crimes such as narcotics trafficking and violent crime.

The CID is the FBI's largest operational division, with 4,800 field special agents, 300 intelligence analysts, and 520 Headquarters employees. Following the September 11 terror attacks, the CID was dramatically restructured with a significant portion of its resources being diverted into the new FBI National Security Branch.

Leadership
Headed by an FBI assistant director, the CID is responsible to the executive assistant director of the FBI Criminal, Cyber, Response, and Services Branch.

The current CID assistant director is Calvin Shivers.

Organization
The CID's organizational structure was reorganized during FY 2004 by FBI leadership in an effort to better reflect current trends in criminal activity.
 Branch I (Criminal Enterprise Branch)
Transnational Organized Crime-Western Hemisphere Section – addresses drugs, gangs, and major thefts
Transnational Organized Crime-Eastern Hemisphere Section
Transnational Criminal Enterprise Section – investigate organized crime matters
Violent Crime Section
Organized Crime Section
Violent Crimes Against Children Section
 Branch II (National Crimes Branch)
Public Corruption and Civil Rights Section
Financial Crime Section
Investigative Support Section
National Covert Operations Section
 Intelligence Branch
Criminal Intelligence Section
Operational Support Section

References

External links
Federal Bureau of Investigation Website
Official Criminal, Cyber, Response, and Services Branch Website
Criminal Investigative Division

Federal Bureau of Investigation
United States intelligence agencies